Nouvel Horizon is an economic weekly newspaper in Senegal.

References

Newspapers published in Senegal
Publications with year of establishment missing